The R3 Head and neck restraint device is a device for protecting race car drivers in the event of an accident by controlling head movement, reducing head and neck injuries due to whiplash. It consists of a carbon fiber cross which is worn like a vest. The cross goes against the driver's back and Kevlar straps hold it on. These are clipped at the front. The top of the cross has straps which attach with clips to the helmet.

The R3 has passed SFI 38.1 testing and has some of the best angular impact test scores of any Head and Neck Restraints. It has yet to pass the FIA test.

External links
LFT Tech, manufacturer of the R3 device
Trackpedia article on H&N restraints

Vehicle safety technologies